St. Stanislaus Bishop & Martyr's Parish - designated for Polish immigrants in Chelsea, Massachusetts, United States.

 Founded in 1905. It is one of the Polish-American Roman Catholic parishes in New England in the Archdiocese of Boston. The architect of the church was Edward T. P. Graham who designed many Roman Catholic churches in Boston and the Midwest.

Bibliography 
 
 Our Lady of Czestochowa Parish - Centennial 1893-1993
 The Official Catholic Directory in USA

External links 
 St. Stanislaus Bishop & Martyr - Diocesan information
 St. Stanislaus Bishop & Martyr - ParishesOnline.com
 Roman Catholic Archdiocese of Boston
 Stanislaus Parish, Chelsea, suppressed

Roman Catholic parishes of Archdiocese of Boston
Polish-American Roman Catholic parishes in Massachusetts